Buellia capensis is a species of crustose lichen in the family Caliciaceae. Found in South Africa, it was formally described as  new species in 2021 by John Elix and Helmut Mayrhofer. It is only known from the type collection. The contains several secondary compounds, including lichexanthone and secalonic acid A as major metabolites, and trace amounts of fumarprotocetraric acid and succinprotocetraric acid. The specific epithet capensis refers to the region of the type locality.

See also
List of Buellia species

References

capensis
Lichen species
Lichens described in 2021
Lichens of South Africa
Taxa named by John Alan Elix